This is a list of symphonies in E minor written by notable composers.

See also

For symphonies in E major, see List of symphonies in E major. For other keys, see List of symphonies by key.

Notes

References
Frisch, Walter, Brahms: The Four Symphonies. New Haven: Yale University Press (2003)

E minor
Symphonies